Three Thousand Years is a science fiction novel by American writer Thomas Calvert McClary. It was first published in book form in 1954 by Fantasy Press in an edition of 1,454 copies.  The novel was originally serialized in the magazine Astounding SF in 1938 and was rewritten for book release. 

The novel concerns scientists who attempt to build a utopia after the earth has been placed in suspended animation for 3,000 years.

Reception
Anthony Boucher panned the novel, finding it "inept, improbable and crudely written." P. Schuyler Miller found the novel "crude [but] not so archaic as you might suppose."

References

Sources

External links 
 

1954 American novels
1954 science fiction novels
American science fiction novels
Utopian novels
Works originally published in Analog Science Fiction and Fact
Novels first published in serial form
Fantasy Press books